Paul Konrad Müller (11 March 1923 – 2 September 2016) was a Swiss actor who appeared mostly in Italian films. His motion picture acting career in Europe spanned a period of 51 years.

Acting career

Theatre
In 1941/1942 he studied acting at the "Conservatoire National Supérieur d`Art Dramatique" in Paris. Until 1944 he had different engagements at theatres in Paris, e. g. "Theatre Pigalle", "Salle Pleyel", "Theatre des Ambassadeurs".
From 1944 to 1946 he was called up for military service in the French Army in Indochina shortly before the First Indochina War took place there. He caught malaria during that time and, in consequence of the disease, was left hard of hearing. 
From 1947 to 1948 he had different engagements at theatres and touring companies not only in France, but also in the French part of Allied-occupied Germany and in Florence, e. g. "Tournée Spectacles Moyses", Teatro della Pergola. He acted, inter alia, under the direction of Georges Douking. His first film role came at age 25 in Ruy Blas (1948).

Film
Paul Muller appeared in over 230 films since his first role in 1948. He spent most of his life by working in Italy, his main country of residence. 
He worked over more than 60 years with most of the well-known European actresses and actors of classic cinema and with some famous names of the Cinema of Italy like Roberto Rossellini, Carlo Ponti, Federico Fellini, Mario Bava, Sergio Corbucci, Michelangelo Antonioni. He also made his appearance in films under the direction of Veit Harlan, Artur Brauner, Jesús "Jess" Franco, René Clément, Michael Curtiz, Richard Fleischer, Jean-Pierre Mocky and many others. (Jesus Franco alone co-starred him in no less than 18 films).

Personal life and death
Muller died in Tivoli, Lazio on 2 September 2016, at the age of 93.

Selected filmography
 Ruy Blas (dir. Pierre Billon, 1948)
 Une grande fille toute simple (dir. Jacques Manuel, 1948)
 Buried Alive (dir. Guido Brignone, 1949), as Count Federico De Rossi
 Fabiola (dir. Alessandro Blasetti, 1949)
 William Tell (dir. Giorgio Pastina and Michał Waszyński, 1949), as Gessler
 Il bacio di una morta (dir. Guido Brignone, 1949), as Hans
 Sicilian Uprising (dir. Giorgio Pastina, 1949), as Duke de Saint-Rémy, Governor of Palermo
 Il falco rosso (dir. Carlo Ludovico Bragaglia, 1949), as Baron Goffredo
 Romanticismo (dir. Clemente Fracassi, 1949), as Cesky
 Toto Looks for a Wife (dir. Carlo Ludovico Bragaglia, 1950), as Carlo
 The Transporter (dir. Giorgio Simonelli, 1950)
 The Black Captain (dir. Giorgio Ansoldi and Alberto Pozzetti, 1951), as Giuliano
 Four Ways Out (dir. Pietro Germi, 1951), as Guido Marchi
 Revenge of the Pirates (dir. Primo Zeglio, 1951), as Espinosa
 Stasera sciopero (dir. Mario Bonnard, 1951), as The mad man
 Repentance (dir. Mario Costa, 1952), as Berardo Morelli 
 Viva il cinema! (dir. Giorgio Baldaccini and Enzo Trapani, 1952)
 La voce del sangue (dir. Pino Mercanti, 1952), as Count Franco Sampieri
 Abracadabra (dir. Max Neufeld, 1952), as Alfredo
 Lieutenant Giorgio (dir. Raffaello Matarazzo, 1952), as Count Stefano di Monserrato
 Brothers of Italy (dir. Fausto Saraceni, 1952), as Luigi Staffi
 I sette dell'Orsa maggiore (dir. Duilio Coletti, 1953), as Enemy agent
 The Blind Woman of Sorrento (dir. Giacomo Gentilomo, 1953), as Carlo Basileo
 Anna's Sin (dir. Camillo Mastrocinque, 1953), as Alberto
 I misteri della giungla nera (dir. Ralph Murphy and Gian Paolo Callegari, 1954), as Suyodhana
 La prigioniera di Amalfi (dir. Giorgio Cristallini, 1954), as Baron Cangemi
 Two Nights with Cleopatra (dir. Mario Mattoli, 1954), as Tortul
 Public Opinion (dir. Maurizio Corgnati and Goffredo Alessandrini, 1954), as Carlo Leone
 La vendetta dei Tughs (dir. Ralph Murphy and Gian Paolo Callegari, 1954), as Suyodhana
 Schiava del peccato (dir. Raffaello Matarazzo, 1954), as Voyager
 Journey to Italy (dir. Roberto Rossellini, 1954), as Paul Dupont
  (dir. Veit Harlan, 1955), as Richard Sorge
 Suonno d'ammore (dir. Sergio Corbucci, 1955), as Carmelo
 Tom Toms of Mayumba (dir. Gian Gaspare Napolitano, 1955), as Dr. Assar
 Agguato sul mare (dir. Pino Mercanti, 1955), as Baron Staratta
 Lacrime di sposa (dir. Sante Chimirri, 1956), as Toni Icardi
 Incatenata dal destino (dir. Enzo Di Gianni, 1956), as Piero
 Checkpoint (dir. Ralph Thomas, 1956), as Petersen
 The Adventures of Arsène Lupin (dir. Jacques Becker, 1957), as Rudolf von Kraft
 I Vampiri (dir. Riccardo Freda and Mario Bava, 1957), as Joseph Signoret
 Pirate of the Half Moon (dir. Giuseppe Maria Scotese, 1957), as Charles V
 Il Conte di Matera (dir. Luigi Capuano, 1958), as Filiberto
  (dir. Marino Girolami, 1958), as Bevallan
 Quando gli angeli piangono (dir. Marino Girolami, 1958)
 Slave Women of Corinth (dir. Mario Bonnard, 1958), as L'Asiatico
 The Naked Maja (dir. Henry Koster, 1958), as The French ambassador
 Captain Falcon (dir. Carlo Campogalliani, 1958), as Rusca
 Sheba and the Gladiator (dir. Guido Brignone, 1959), as High Priest
 Un canto nel deserto (dir. Marino Girolami, 1959), as Rudi
 Due selvaggi a corte (dir. Ferdinando Baldi, 1959), as Count Sarzese
 Signé Arsène Lupin (dir. Yves Robert, 1959), as Attaché at the embassy in Rome
 Purple Noon (dir. René Clément, 1960), as The blind man
 La strada dei giganti (dir. Guido Malatesta, 1960), as Count Monza
 Queen of the Pirates (dir. Mario Costa, 1960), as Duke Zulian
 The Conqueror of the Orient (dir. Tanio Boccia, 1960), as Sultan Dakar
 Minotaur, the Wild Beast of Crete (dir. Silvio Amadio, 1960), as Medico di Corte
 La grande vallata (dir. Angelo Dorigo, 1961)
 The Wastrel (dir. Michael Cacoyannis, 1961)
 Legge di guerra (dir. Bruno Paolinelli, 1961), as Interpreter
 Capitani di ventura (dir. Angelo Dorigo, 1961), as Count Falcino
 Pontius Pilate (dir. Irving Rapper and Gian Paolo Callegari, 1962), as Mehlik
 Avenger of the Seven Seas (dir. Domenico Paolella, 1962), as Hornblut
 Lasciapassare per il morto (dir. Mario Gariazzo, 1962), as The fourth accomplice
 It Happened in Athens (dir. Andrew Marton, 1962), as Priest
 Women of Devil's Island (dir. Domenico Paolella, 1962), as Lefèvre
 Attack of the Normans (dir. Giuseppe Vari, 1962), as Thomas
 Street of Temptation (dir. Imo Moszkowicz, 1962), as Dr. Salvatori
 Torpedo Bay (dir. Charles Frend and Bruno Vailati, 1963), as Police Commander
 Goliath and the Sins of Babylon (dir. Michele Lupo, 1963), as King Rukus of Cafaus
 Kali Yug: Goddess of Vengeance (dir. Mario Camerini, 1963), as Botanist Alamian
 Desert Raiders (dir. Tanio Boccia, 1964), as Yussuf
 Cover Girls (dir. José Bénazéraf, 1964), as Enrico 
 Da Istanbul ordine di uccidere (dir. Carlo Ferrero, 1965)
 Fall of the Mohicans (dir. Mateo Cano, 1965), as Colonel Munro
 Nightmare Castle (dir. Mario Caiano, 1965), as Dr. Stephen Arrowsmith
 Von Ryan's Express (die. Mark Robson, 1965), as Capt. Josef Sonneberg (uncredited) 
 Don Camillo in Moscow (dir. Luigi Comencini, 1965), as Russian priest
 La vendetta di Lady Morgan (dir. Massimo Pupillo, 1965), as Sir Harold Morgan
 Thompson 1880 (dir. Guido Zurli, 1966), as Jameson Brady
 Silenzio: Si uccide (dir. Guido Zurli, 1967), as Theotocritos
  (dir. Bitto Albertini, 1968)
 Uno di più all'inferno (dir. Giovanni Fago, 1968), as George Ward
 Stuntman (dir. Marcello Baldi, 1968), as Lamb
 Bootleggers (dir. Alfio Caltabiano, 1969), as Pythagoras
 Malenka (dir. Amando de Ossorio, 1969), as Dr. Albert
 Venus in Furs (dir. Jesús Franco, 1969), as Hermann
 How Did a Nice Girl Like You Get Into This Business? (dir. Will Tremper, 1970), as The Director
Eugenie… The Story of Her Journey into Perversion (dir. Jesús Franco, 1970), as Monsieur de Mistival
Eugenie de Sade (dir. Jesús Franco, shot in 1970 and released in 1973), as Albert Radeck de Franval
 Count Dracula (dir. Jesús Franco, 1970), as Dr. Seward
 Angeli senza paradiso (dir. Ettore Maria Fizzarotti, 1970), as Hermann Fux
 The Devil Came from Akasava (dir. Jesús Franco, 1971), as Dr. Henry
 Vampyros Lesbos (dir. Jesús Franco, 1971), as Dr. Steiner
  (dir. Jesús Franco, 1971), as John Somers
 L'Albatros (dir. Jean-Pierre Mocky, 1971), as President Ernest Cavalier
 Lady Frankenstein (dir. Mel Welles, 1971), as Dr. Charles Marshall
 She Killed in Ecstasy (dir. Jesús Franco, 1971), as Dr. Franklin Houston
 Gang War in Naples (dir. Pasquale Squitieri, 1972), as L'onorevole
 Life Is Tough, Eh Providence? (dir. Giulio Petroni, 1972), as Mr. Summitt
 Treasure Island (dir. John Hough, 1972), as Blind Pew
 Tragic Ceremony (dir. Riccardo Freda, 1972), as Doctor
 Maria Rosa la guardona (dir. Marino Girolami, 1973)
 Studio legale per una rapina (dir. Tanio Boccia, 1973), as Albert
 The Edifying and Joyous Story of Colinot (dir. Nina Companeez, 1973), as Brother Hugo
 A Virgin Among the Living Dead (dir. Jesús Franco, 1973), as Ernesto Pablo Reiner
 The Arena (dir. Steve Carver, 1974), as Lucilius
 Miracles Still Happen (dir. Giuseppe Maria Scotese, 1974), as Juliane's father
 Kidnap (dir. Giovanni Fago, 1974), as Jimmy
 Un linceul n'a pas de poches (dir. Jean-Pierre Mocky, 1974), as Minecci
 Heroes in Hell (dir. Joe D'Amato, 1974), as German Soldier
 Furia nera (dir. Demofilo Fidani, 1975)
 Une vierge pour Saint-Tropez (dir. Georges Friedland, 1975), as Mr. Witson
 Frauengefängnis  Barbed Wire Dolls (dir. Jesús Franco, 1976), as Carlos Costa
 Tutto suo padre (dir. Maurizio Lucidi, 1976), as Stringer
 Mark Strikes Again (dir. Stelvio Massi, 1976), as Austrian inspector
 A Woman at Her Window (dir. Pierre Granier-Deferre, 1976), as Hotel manager
 The Witness (dir. Jean-Pierre Mocky, 1978), as Maurisson's brother-in-law
 The Perfect Crime (dir. Giuseppe Rosati, 1978), as Gibson
 Derrick – Season 6, Episode 7: "Lena" (TV, 1979), as Mr. Witte
 Fantozzi contro tutti (dir. Neri Parenti and Paolo Villaggio, 1980), as Visconte Cobram
 Camera d'albergo (dir. Mario Monicelli, 1981), as Hans
 Sogni mostruosamente proibiti (dir. Neri Parenti, 1982), as The hotel butler
 Nana, the True Key of Pleasure (dir. Dan Wolman, 1983), as Xavier
 The Practice of Love (dir. Valie Export, 1985), as French Industrialist
 The Two Lives of Mattia Pascal (dir. Mario Monicelli, 1985), as Thief in Monte Carlo
 Fracchia contro Dracula (dir. Neri Parenti, 1985), as The employer of Fracchia
 Let's Hope It's a Girl (dir. Mario Monicelli, 1986), as Priest
 Salome (dir. Claude d'Anna, 1986), as Doctor
 Meglio baciare un cobra (dir. Massimo Pirri, 1986), as Fontaine
  (dir. Antonio Margheriti, 1988), as Carbalo
 Fantozzi va in pensione (dir. Neri Parenti, 1988), as Duke Count Francesco Maria Barambani
 La bottega dell'orefice (dir. Michael Anderson, 1989), as Driver
 Fantozzi alla riscossa (dir. Neri Parenti, 1990), as Duke Count Francesco Maria Barambani
 Paprika (dir. Tinto Brass, 1991), as Milvio
 Le comiche 2 (dir. Neri Parenti, 1991), as the Colonel
 Li chiamarono... briganti! (dir. Pasquale Squitieri, 1999), as Bishop of Melfi

Awards and honours
In 2009 the German film production company Anolis published a Collector's Edition of Mario Bava's and Ricardo Freda's masterpiece I Vampiri (Der Vampir von Notre-Dame) on a 2-DVD-Set. That item includes, inter alia, three different versions of the first Italian horror movie of the sound era and an exclusive interview with actor Paul Müller about his career ("C'est la Vie – Paul Muller erzählt"). It is the only on-screen interview appearance of him in existence. The DVD is especially dedicated to Muller and his remarkable work within the European film industry.

Further reading
Jess Franco, *Memorias del tío Jess (2004) (autobiography, in Spanish)
Lucas Balbo, Peter Blumenstock, Christian Kessler, Tim Lucas, *Obsession – The Films of Jess Franco (1993)
Benedikt Eppenberger, Daniel Stapfer *Maedchen, Machos und Moneten: Die unglaubliche Geschichte des Schweizer Kinounternehmers Erwin C. Dietrich. Mit einem Vorwort von Jess Franco. Verlag Scharfe Stiefel, Zurich, 2006,

References

External links

1923 births
2016 deaths
20th-century Swiss male actors
People from Neuchâtel
Swiss male film actors
Swiss male stage actors
Swiss male television actors
Swiss expatriates in Italy
French Army personnel of World War II